An ecodistrict or eco-district is a neologism associating the terms "district" and "eco" as an abbreviation of ecological.
It designates an urban planning aiming to integrate objectives of sustainable development and social equity and reduce the ecological footprint of a neighborhood, urban area, or region. This notion insists on the consideration of the whole environmental issues by way of a collaborative process.

In order to design ecodistricts, one needs to completely redesign their energy system plans. The usage of photovoltaic panels and electric vehicles is common.

Examples 
Ecodistricts can be found in metropolises such as :
 Stockholm (Hammarby Sjöstad) (Sweden)
 Hanover (Germany)
 Marseille (Euroméditerranée) (France)
 Bordeaux (Ginko) (France)
 Freiburg im Breisgau (Vauban, Freiburg) (Germany)
 Malmö (BO01) (Sweden)
 London (BedZED) (United Kingdom)
 Grenoble (De Bonne and Blanche Monier) (France)
 Dongtan (China)
 EVA Lanxmeer (Netherlands)
 Amsterdam-Noord (Netherlands)
 Jono district low-carbon project (Kitakyushu, Japan)
 Frequel-Fontarabie (Paris, France)
 Atlanta (Midtown, Atlanta Georgia) (United States)
 Energy Hub Project— Tweewaters Leuven (Belgium)
 Etna, PA named first ever US Ecodistrict in 2019 (Etna, Pennsylvania)

See also

Ecological footprint
Ecological debt
Ecovillage
Green building
Green retrofit
Peri-urbanisation
Sustainable city
Sustainable design
Sustainable transport
Transition town
Urban agriculture
Urban ecology
Urban forest
Urban green space
Urban vitality
Vertical farming

References 

City
Sustainable design
Sustainable urban planning
Environmental planning
Landscape architecture